Belgium originally planned to participate in the Eurovision Song Contest 2020 with the song "Release Me" written by Alex Callier and Luca Chiaravalli. The song was performed by the band Hooverphonic, which was internally selected by the Flemish broadcaster Vlaamse Radio- en Televisieomroeporganisatie (VRT) in October 2019 to represent the nation at the 2020 contest in Rotterdam, Netherlands. The song, "Release Me", was presented to the public on 17 February 2020.

Belgium was drawn to compete in the first semi-final of the Eurovision Song Contest which took place on 12 May 2020. However, the contest was cancelled due to the COVID-19 pandemic.

Background

In 2019, Eliot represented the country with the song "Wake Up", placing thirteenth in the first semi-final and failing to advance to the final.

The Belgian broadcaster for the 2020 contest, who broadcasts the event in Belgium and organises the selection process for its entry, was Vlaamse Radio- en Televisieomroeporganisatie (VRT). The Belgian participation in the contest alternates between two broadcasters: the Flemish VRT and the Walloon Radio Télévision Belge de la Communauté Française (RTBF). Both broadcasters have selected the Belgian entry using national finals and internal selections in the past. In 2018 and 2019, both VRT and RTBF internally selected the Belgian entry. On 24 May 2019, VRT confirmed Belgium's participation in the 2020 Eurovision Song Contest and continued the internal selection procedure.

Before Eurovision

Internal selection 
The Belgian entry for the 2020 Eurovision Song Contest was selected via an internal selection by VRT. On 7 September 2019, the broadcaster's general music coordinator Gerrit Kerremans revealed that the artist would be selected by an A&R Team (Arts and Repertoire) consisting of music experts and that several acts were being considered. On 1 October 2019, the broadcaster announced that the band Hooverphonic would represent Belgium in Rotterdam. The song the band would perform at the contest, "Release Me", was presented to the public on 17 February 2020 during the radio MNM programme De Grote Peter Van de Veire Ochtendshow. The song was written by member of Hooverphonic, Alex Callier, along with Luca Chiaravalli. The music video for the song, directed by Matthias Lebeer, was released on the same day of the presentation.

At Eurovision 
According to Eurovision rules, all nations with the exceptions of the host country and the "Big Five" (France, Germany, Italy, Spain and the United Kingdom) are required to qualify from one of two semi-finals in order to compete for the final; the top ten countries from each semi-final progress to the final. The European Broadcasting Union (EBU) split up the competing countries into six different pots based on voting patterns from previous contests, with countries with favourable voting histories put into the same pot. On 28 January 2020, a special allocation draw was held which placed each country into one of the two semi-finals, as well as which half of the show they would perform in. Belgium was placed into the first semi-final, to be held on 12 May 2020, and was scheduled to perform in the second half of the show. However, due to the COVID-19 pandemic, the contest was cancelled.

Prior to the Eurovision Song Celebration YouTube broadcast in place of the semi-finals, it was revealed that Belgium was set to perform in position 9, before the entry from Russia and after the entry from Malta.

References

External links
 Eurovision official site

2020
Countries in the Eurovision Song Contest 2020
Eurovision